Stan Thomas (5 September 1919 – October 1985) was an English footballer, who played as an inside forward in the Football League for Tranmere Rovers.

References

Tranmere Rovers F.C. players
Association football inside forwards
English Football League players
1919 births
1985 deaths
People from Birkenhead
English footballers